Bamena is a Bamiléké village and commune in western Cameroon.

See also
Communes of Cameroon

References

Communes of Cameroon
West Region (Cameroon)
Cameroon geography articles needing translation from French Wikipedia